The men's freestyle bantamweight competition at the 1964 Summer Olympics in Tokyo took place from 11 to 14 October at the Komazawa Gymnasium. Nations were limited to one competitor.

Competition format

This freestyle wrestling competition continued to use the "bad points" elimination system introduced at the 1928 Summer Olympics for Greco-Roman and at the 1932 Summer Olympics for freestyle wrestling, as adjusted at the 1960 Summer Olympics. Each bout awarded 4 points. If the victory was by fall, the winner received 0 and the loser 4. If the victory was by decision, the winner received 1 and the loser 3. If the bout was tied, each wrestler received 2 points. A wrestler who accumulated 6 or more points was eliminated. Rounds continued until there were 3 or fewer uneliminated wrestlers. If only 1 wrestler remained, he received the gold medal. If 2 wrestlers remained, point totals were ignored and they faced each other for gold and silver (if they had already wrestled each other, that result was used). If 3 wrestlers remained, point totals were ignored and a round-robin was held among those 3 to determine medals (with previous head-to-head results, if any, counting for this round-robin).

Results

Round 1

 Bouts

 Points

Round 2

Seven wrestlers had their second loss in as many rounds and were eliminated, leaving 13 to advance. Varga, Choi, and Uetake each had 0 points. There were 2 wrestlers at each other possible point total (1 point through 5 points) remaining. Hirabayashi, however, withdrew after this round.

 Bouts

 Points

Round 3

Four wrestlers were eliminated in this round, with Siraj-Din also withdrawing to leave only 7 men advancing. All three wrestlers who started the round with 0 points picked up at least 1; Choi and Uetake shared the lead with just 1 point. Three wrestlers had 2 points.

 Bouts

 Points

Round 4

Varga, who had not had any points after round 2, was the only man eliminated in round 4 after two straight losses. The leaders coming into the round, Uetake and Choi, faced each other with neither in danger of elimination; Uetake won to stay in the lead. He was now joined by Ibrahimov at 2 points, after the latter wrestler had a bye. 

 Bouts

 Points

Round 5

The three losers were all eliminated; the three winners advanced to a final round-robin.

 Bouts

 Points

Final round

None of the three medalists had faced another yet, so the final round was a full round-robin. In the first bout, Uetake defeated Ibrahimov. In the second, Akbaş also defeated Ibrahimov, giving the latter wrestler the bronze wrestler and setting up a gold medal bout between Uetake and Akbaş. Uetake won to claim Japan's first gold medal in the weight class since 1952.

 Bouts

 Points

References

Wrestling at the 1964 Summer Olympics